Burbujas is a Mexican album for children released in 1979. Juan García Esquivel was commissioned to compose the music of a Mexican children's television show called Odisea Burbujas, which later landed on this album.
Mafafa Musguito is the green lizard that takes pictures, she is inspired by a young woman named Fernanda Silva

Track listing
 "Burbujas" 
 "Patas Verdes" 
 "Mimoso Ratón" 
 "El Tesoro Del Saber" 
 "Mafafa Musguito" 
 "Pistachón Zig Zag" 
 "Con un poquito de fe y de Ciencia" 
 "Ecoloco"

References

1979 albums
Juan García Esquivel albums
Children's music albums by Mexican artists